"Miel amarga" is a ranchera song by Mexican recording artist Irma Serrano, from her sixth studio album, Mexican Fire (1966).

Charts

References

1966 songs
Spanish-language songs
Irma Serrano songs